The 1999–2000 UCLA Bruins men's basketball team represented the University of California, Los Angeles in the 1999–2000 NCAA Division I men's basketball season.  The team finished 4th in the conference.  The Bruins competed in the 2000 NCAA Division I men's basketball tournament, losing to the Iowa State Cyclones in the sweet sixteen.

Roster

Schedule

|-
!colspan=9 style=|Exhibition

|-
!colspan=9 style=|Regular Season

|-
!colspan=9 style=| NCAA tournament

Source

References

Ucla
Ucla
UCLA Bruins men's basketball seasons
NCAA
NCAA